The men's team competition of the table tennis event at the 2017 Southeast Asian Games will be held from 24 to 26 August at the MiTEC Hall 7 in Kuala Lumpur, Malaysia.

Schedule
All times are Malaysian Time (UTC+08:00).

Results

Preliminary round

Group A

Group B

Knockout round

Semifinals

Gold medal match

References

External links
 

Men's team